Deslandes is a French surname. Notable people with the surname include:

André-François Deslandes (1689–1757), French philosopher
Carolina Deslandes (born 1991), Portuguese singer-songwriter
Charlie Deslandes (1900–1967), Australian rules footballer
Flávio Deslandes, Brazilian industrial designer
Ghislain Deslandes (born 1970), French philosopher
Madeleine Deslandes (1866–1929), French writer
Paulin Deslandes (1806–1866), French playwright
Raymond Deslandes (1825–1890), French journalist, playwright and theatre manager
Sylvain Deslandes (born 1997), French footballer

French-language surnames